Doo Lough, the name of a lake in Ireland, may refer to:
 Doo Lough (Clare), a lake in County Clare
 Doo Lough (Mayo), a lake in County Mayo on the Murrisk Peninsula